Kelley and Browne Flats is a national historic district located at St. Joseph, Missouri. The district encompasses two sets of rowhouses consisting of five contributing buildings. They were built in 1888 and about 1890, and both are two-story brick buildings with Queen Anne style detailing.

It was listed on the National Register of Historic Places in 1989.

References

Historic districts on the National Register of Historic Places in Missouri
Residential buildings on the National Register of Historic Places in Missouri
Queen Anne architecture in Missouri
Residential buildings completed in 1888
Historic districts in St. Joseph, Missouri
National Register of Historic Places in Buchanan County, Missouri